Holy See–Saudi Arabia relations do not officially exist but there have been some important high-level meetings between Saudi and Holy See officials to discuss issues and organize dialogue between religions.

History
In November 2007, King Abdullah of Saudi Arabia visited the Vatican in a historic moment, which signaled an end to the 1,400-year-old chill in relations between the Arab state and its predecessor states' leaders and Vatican leaders.

Proposals have been made to build a church somewhere in Saudi Arabia, citing the ancient 7th century Najran Pact made by Muhammad to Christian residents of Arabia..

There are many foreign workers that identify as Christian, and at present, they must cross a border to a surrounding country to find a church affiliated to the Roman Catholic church. Discussions have until now focused on the fair treatment of those foreign workers. This issue was given high priority in Pope Benedict XVI's address to the diplomatic corps in January 2011, where the Pope expressed the hope for a speedy establishment of a Catholic hierarchy within the kingdom.

See also
 Foreign relations of the Holy See
 Foreign relations of Saudi Arabia
 Christianity in Saudi Arabia

References

 
Saudi Arabia
Bilateral relations of Saudi Arabia
Catholicism and Islam
Catholic Church in Saudi Arabia